Ludden may refer to:

 Ludden, North Dakota, United States

People with the surname
 Allen Ludden (1917–1981), American game-show host
 Brad Ludden (born 1981), American professional kayaker
 Raymond P. Ludden (1909–1979), American Department of State official